5600 West Old Bingham Highway station is a light rail station in West Jordan, Utah, United States, served by the Red Line of the Utah Transit Authority's (UTA) TRAX light rail system. The Red Line provides service from the University of Utah to the Daybreak community of South Jordan.

Description 
The station is located at 5651 West Old Bingham Highway and is accessible from that roadway. It is also slightly northeast of the Mountain View Corridor (SR-85)/Old Bingham Highway interchange. The station has a free park and ride lot with 420 parking spaces available, but there are plans for more than 620 parking spaces. In the early planning stages, the station was referred to as "5600 West Station", but later changed to the current name. Notwithstanding, the signage at the station (the Park and Ride and the passenger platform) indicates "5651 W. Old Bingham Hwy". The station opened August 7, 2011, as part of the Red Line (Mid-Jordan) and is operated by the Utah Transit Authority.

References 

TRAX (light rail) stations
Railway stations in Salt Lake County, Utah
2011 establishments in Utah
Railway stations in the United States opened in 2011